USS Chariton River (LSM(R)-407) was an LSM(R)-401-class medium-type landing ship (LSM) built for the United States Navy during World War II. Named for the Chariton River in northern Missouri and southern Iowa, she was the only US Naval vessel to bear the name.

Service history
Laid down at Charleston Navy Yard on 22 January 1945, she was launched on 12 February 1945. Among those present at the launching party were Rear admiral Jules James, Commandant of the 6th Naval District, and Mrs. J.E. Hunt, ships sponsor and wife of U.S. Navy Captain J.E. Hunt. The ship was commissioned as LSM(R)-407 on 9 May 1945 with LT (jg) Robert C. Van Vleck, USNR, commanding.

The ship saw no combat action in World War II and was placed in the Pacific Reserve Fleet near Astoria, Oregon on 10 February 1947. The ships name was changed to the USS Chariton River on 1 October 1955. Struck from the U.S. Naval registry in 1958, the ship was sold to the Tacoma Tug & Barge Company of Tacoma, Washington in 1960 and underwent conversion to a barge.

See also
 List of United States Navy LSMs

References

 

Ships built in Charleston, South Carolina
LSM(R)-401-class medium landing ships
World War II amphibious warfare vessels of the United States
1945 ships